The 1902 Dartmouth football team was an American football team that represented Dartmouth College as an independent during the 1902 college football season. In its second and final season under head coach Walter McCornack, the team compiled a 6–2–1 record, shut out five of nine opponents, and outscored opponents by a total of 105 to 39. Victor M. Place was the team captain. The team played its home games at Alumni Oval in Hanover, New Hampshire.

Schedule

References

Dartmouth
Dartmouth Big Green football seasons
Dartmouth football